Windsor Drive is an American indie rock band from Wausau, Wisconsin, formed in 2008. The band consists of Kipp Wilde (vocals, keys), Owen Jones (drums), Daniel Sukow (guitar, vocals), and Jon Wasleske (bass).  Their music video for "Fall" was premiered by Ryan Seacrest on E! News on January 19, 2010.  On September 25, 2012, the band released the EP "Wanderlust", co-produced and co-written by John Fields and Bleu.

Tours

 2014 Headlining tour in Japan
 Through April and May 2012, they toured with He Is We on their "Give It All" tour.
 2012 -co headlining tour with From Indian Lakes
 Performed a headlining slot on the Kia Kevin Says Stage in the summer of 2011 on the Vans Warped Tour.
 Opened for Mae and Terrible Things on their "Goodbye, Goodnight" tour in the fall of 2010.
 In December 2009 and again in May 2010, they co-headlined tour dates with Frank + Derol.

Band members

Current members
Kipp Wilde  – Vocals, Keys
Owen Jones – Drums
Daniel Sukow – Guitar, Vocals
Jon Wasleske – Bass

Discography

Extended plays

Singles
"I Don't Feel It"
"Sleepwalking"
"Going Under"
"Fall"

References

External links
 Official Website
 

American pop rock music groups
Wausau, Wisconsin
Rock music groups from Wisconsin